The Women's United States Squash Open 2015 is the women's edition of the 2015 United States Open (squash), which is a WSA World Series event (prize money: $150 000). The event took place at the Daskalakis Athletic Center in Philadelphia, Pennsylvania in the United States from the 10th of October to the 17th of October. Laura Massaro won her second US Open trophy, beating Nour El Tayeb in the final.

Prize money and ranking points
For 2015, the prize purse was $150,000. The prize money and points breakdown was as follows:

Seeds

Draw and results

See also
United States Open (squash)
2015–16 PSA World Series
Men's United States Open (squash) 2015

References

External links
PSA US Open 2015 website
US Squash Open official website

Women's US Open
Women's US Open
2015 in American sports
Squash tournaments in the United States
2015 in women's squash
Squash in Pennsylvania